A world city is a city deemed to be an important node point in the global economic system.

World city may also refer to:
 Ecumenopolis, the hypothetical concept of a planetwide city
 Great World City, a building complex in Singapore
 Mahindra World City, special economic zones in India

See also 
 List of largest cities